Georgie Gardner (born 1 June 1970) is an Australian television and news presenter and journalist.

Gardner is currently presenter on Nine News Sydney. She has previously been a co-host and news presenter on the Nine Network's breakfast program Today.

Career
Gardner joined the Nine Network in July 2002 to present weather on Nine News in Sydney, and to host afternoon updates. In 2004, the Nine Network added a semi-national news bulletin at 4:30 pm, National Nine News Afternoon Edition, for which Gardner was the original presenter.

Gardner has worked at Network Ten as a reporter and presenter for Ten News. Her most prominent national role came with the Seven Network as co-host of Seven News Sunrise, which she presented with Mark Beretta before the program was changed from morning news to morning public affairs programming. She held this position for two years before acting as a fill-in presenter for Seven News and Sky News Australia.

She is the only Australian news presenter to have presented the late news bulletin on each of the three major commercial TV networks, having filled in as presenter of the Ten Late News, as full-time presenter of Seven Late News, and as a substitute presenter of Nightline, the late night version of Nine News.

In 2006, Gardner replaced Leila McKinnon as presenter of National Nine News Morning Edition. In December 2006, she replaced Sharyn Ghidella as news presenter on Today, when Ghidella resigned and switched to the Seven Network to present Seven News in Brisbane. Gardner returned to Today after six months'  maternity leave on Monday 6 August 2007, Allison Langdon having filled the on-air role while Gardner was on maternity leave.

On 3 October 2007, Gardner was unable to continue reading the news bulletins due to the death of former West Coast Eagles star Chris Mainwaring, whose wife Rani, who lived in Perth, was a close friend of Gardner.

In July 2009, Gardner was appointed Nine News Sydney weekend presenter, replacing Mark Ferguson after he signed with the Seven Network.

Gardner received her media training at the Western Australian Academy of Performing Arts. She has received multiple awards and accolades throughout her career and is known to be highly intellectual. She received outstanding results in all of her aptitude tests during her application to the Nine Network in 2002 including scoring 149 on her IQ test.

On 26 May 2014, Gardner announced on Today that she would be leaving the show to spend more time with family while continuing with the Nine Network on Nine News and 60 Minutes. Gardner's final appearance on Today, on Friday 6 June 2014, attracted the program's highest ratings for some time: 359,000 viewers according to Oztam figures accessed from the web blog TV Tonight. This was seen by some as a respectful way to farewell the "elegant", "gracious" personality. Gardner was replaced by Nine News reporter Sylvia Jeffreys.

On 23 November 2017, it was confirmed that Gardner was to co-host Today  on the Nine Network after Lisa Wilkinson left due to a salary dispute. She replaced Deborah Knight, who had been hosting Today since Wilkinson left the Nine Network. Her first appearance as new host was on 22 January 2018.

In November 2019, the Nine Network announced that Gardner would no longer co-host Today effective immediately; she would return to presenting Nine News Sydney on Fridays and Saturdays. Karl Stefanovic will return to the show as co-host alongside Weekend Today co-host and 60 Minutes reporter Allison Langdon from January 2020.

Gardner has previously been a fill-in presenter for Sonia Kruger on Today Extra.

References

External links

1971 births
Living people
20th-century Australian journalists
21st-century Australian journalists
People from Perth, Western Australia
Australian television journalists
Australian women journalists
Journalists from Western Australia
Seven News presenters
Nine News presenters
60 Minutes (Australian TV program) correspondents
American women television journalists
20th-century Australian women
21st-century American women